Walter McKennon Denny (October 28, 1853 – November 5, 1926) was a U.S. Representative from Mississippi.

Born in Moss Point in Jackson County, Mississippi, Denny attended the common schools and then Roanoke College in Salem, Virginia. In 1874, he graduated from what is now the University of Mississippi School of Law at Oxford. He was admitted to the bar and commenced practice in Pascagoula, the Jackson County seat of government on the Mississippi Gulf Coast. He served as clerk of the circuit and chancery courts of Jackson County from November 1883 until January 1, 1895. He was a delegate to the Mississippi Constitutional Convention of 1890.

Denny was elected as a Democrat to the Fifty-fourth Congress (March 4, 1895 – March 3, 1897) and was an unsuccessful candidate for renomination in 1896. He then switched to the Republican Party.

He resumed the practice of law in Pascagoula and for fifteen years was legal adviser to the Jackson County Board of Supervisors. He died in Pascagoula and is interred there at Machpelah Cemetery.

References

1853 births
1926 deaths
Roanoke College alumni
University of Mississippi School of Law alumni
Mississippi lawyers
Democratic Party members of the United States House of Representatives from Mississippi
Mississippi Republicans
People from Pascagoula, Mississippi
People from Jackson County, Mississippi
19th-century American lawyers